The England women's national rugby union team, also known as the Red Roses, represents England in women's international rugby union. They compete in the annual Women's Six Nations Championship with France, Ireland, Italy, Scotland and Wales. England have won the championship on a total of 18 out of 27 occasions  – winning the Grand Slam 16 times and the Triple Crown 22 times – making them the most successful side in the tournament's history. They won the  Women's Rugby World Cup in 1994 and 2014, and have been runners-up on five other occasions. Their coach is Simon Middleton.

History 

Until 2009 the badge and logo of England women's national teams was significantly different from that worn by men's teams. However, in 2009 – in anticipation of the merger between the RFU and RFUW – England teams adopted the men's rose.

England have taken part in every Women's Rugby World Cup competition, winning in 1994 and 2014 and finishing as runner-up on five other occasions.

The 1995/1996 season saw the introduction of a Home Nations Championship between England, Ireland, Scotland and Wales, which England won in its inaugural year. England won the Championship every year, except for the 1997/98 season when it was won by Scotland.

France joined the competition in the 1998/99 season making it the Five Nations Championship, with England achieving the Grand Slam in three successive seasons.

In the 2001/02 season, Ireland rejoined the fold in preparation for the World Cup and the competition expanded to be known as the Six Nations. Since then England have finished lower than runner-up on only 2 occasions, in 2013 and 2015 respectively, and have won the title on 13 separate occasions. This includes 7 consecutive tournament triumphs between 2006 and 2012 and the Grand Slam on 11 more occasions, including 3 times in a row between 2006–2008 and 2010–2012, respectively.

Records

Overall 

Full internationals only
Correct as of 30 October 2022

World Cup

Six Nations

Players

Current squad 
On 2 March 2023, England head coach Simon Middleton named a 42-player squad in preparation for the 2023 Women's Six Nations Championship.

 Head coach:  Simon Middleton
 Attack coach:  Scott Bemand
 Forwards coach:  Louis Deacon

Notable players 
England have three former players who have been inducted into the World Rugby Hall of Fame:

Honours 
World Cup
Winners (2): 1994, 2014
Runners-up (6): 1991, 2002, 2006, 2010, 2017, 2021

Six Nations Championship
Winners (18): 1996, 1997, 1999, 2000, 2001, 2003, 2006, 2007, 2008, 2009, 2010, 2011, 2012, 2017, 2019, 2020, 2021, 2022
Grand Slam (16): 1996, 1997, 1999, 2000, 2001, 2003, 2006, 2007, 2008, 2010, 2011, 2012, 2017, 2019, 2020, 2022
Triple Crown (22): 1996, 1997, 1999, 2000, 2001, 2002, 2003, 2004, 2005, 2006, 2007, 2008, 2010, 2011, 2012, 2014, 2016, 2017, 2018, 2019, 2020, 2022

European Championship
Winners (5): 1997, 2007, 2008, 2011, 2012
Runners-up (1): 2004

References

External links 

 
 England Women’s rugby page at The Independent

 
European national women's rugby union teams
 
Women's national rugby union teams